Anthrax pauper is a species of bee flies (insects in the family Bombyliidae).

Distribution
United States.

References

Bombyliidae
Insects described in 1869
Diptera of North America
Taxa named by Hermann Loew